The Princess of Xiaohe or Little River Princess was found in 2003 at Xiaohe Cemetery in Lop Nur, Xinjiang. She is also known as M11 for the tomb she was found in. She was buried around 3,800 years ago and has European features, like many other mummies in this complex. She is unusually well preserved, with clothes, hair, and eyelashes still intact.

Discovery 

The Princess of Xiaohe  was unearthed by the archaeologists of Xinjiang Institute of Archaeology at Xiaohe Cemetery No. 5, Tomb 11, 102 km west of Loulan, Lop Nur, Xinjiang in 2003. They named her the Princess of Xiaohe due to her state of preservation and beauty, not her social status; there is no reason to believe she was any more important than the other mummies buried in the complex. She was part of the Xiaohe culture, and was buried around 3,800 years ago. She is unusually well preserved, with long eyelashes, clothes, and hair still intact. Archeologists attribute this to the dry, salty conditions in the desert and tightly sealed coffins, which were wrapped in cowhide before being buried. As the cowhide dried out, it shrunk, sealing the coffins. Her body was not embalmed before death, but mummified naturally due to the climate and burial method.

Appearances and grave goods 
The Princess has blonde hair and long eyelashes, with some facial features more similar to Indo-Europeans, such as high cheekbones and pale skin. She seems to be smiling slightly. She was 152 centimeters tall. She was buried wearing a white felt hat, a white wool cloak with tassels, and string skirt, with fur-lined leather boots on her feet. She had a red rope necklace and a bracelet with one jade bead on her right arm. She was buried with wooden pins and three small pouches of ephedra. Twigs and branches of ephedra were placed beside the body. Wheat and millet grains, strings made from the tendons of animals, and animal ears were spread over her body. A wooden phallic object was placed between her breasts. Like the other mummies in Xiaohe Cemetery, she was buried in a boat-shaped coffin with a standing wooden pole above it. Her grave had not been disturbed since her burial when it was found by archeologists in 2003.

Chunks of cheese were found on her neck and chest, possibly as food for the afterlife. Archeologists were initially unsure what the clumps on her body were. However, a 2014 study led by Andrej Shevchenko showed that it was cheese. The cheese found on the mummies in this cemetery is the oldest preserved cheese in the world, likely made with a kefir starter. Her entire body and boots were also coated in a white substance, likely also a dairy product but so far of unknown origin.

Exhibitions 
In 2010, she was exhibited at Bowers Museum in Santa Ana, California, Houston Museum of Natural Science, and University of Pennsylvania Museum of Archaeology and Anthropology. In 2019, she was exhibited at the Arthur M. Sackler Museum of Art and Archaeology at Peking University. She was featured in the first episode of the documentary series New Silk Road.

See also 
 Tarim mummies

References 

2nd millennium BC in China
History of Xinjiang